The Bradford House was an historic house in Lewiston, Maine, United States.

The three story brick building was built in 1876 and added to the National Register of Historic Places in 1978.  It was extensively damaged by fire on July 4, 2007, and was later demolished.  It was removed from the National Register in 2015.

See also
National Register of Historic Places listings in Androscoggin County, Maine

References

Houses on the National Register of Historic Places in Maine
Houses completed in 1876
Houses in Lewiston, Maine
Demolished buildings and structures in Maine
National Register of Historic Places in Lewiston, Maine
Former National Register of Historic Places in Maine